Va-Bene Elikem Fiatsi (born in Ho) popularly known as the Crazinst Artist, is a Ghanaian multi-disciplinary artist and the founder and artistic director of perfocraZe International Artists Residency (pIAR) which aims at promoting exchange between international and local artists, activists, researchers, curators, and thinkers. Va-Bene prefers to be addressed as "Sh!t" if not "She".

Early life and education 
She trained as a professional teacher at the then E.P Teacher Training college, Amedzofe (College of Education) and graduated in 2006. She was awarded a bachelor's degree in Fine Arts - (Painting) in 2014 and a Master in Fine Arts (AbD) in 2017 from the Kwame Nkrumah University of Science and Technology (KNUST), Kumasi, Ghana.

Career 
Va-Bene worked at the Ghana Education Service as a professional Teacher from 2006 to 2010. As a performer and installation artist, Sh!t has performed globally and has featured in international magazines and exhibitions. Sh!t is currently a performing artist and the Director of PIAR.

Activism 
Va-Bene is currently a board member of the LGBT+ Rights Ghana.

References 

Living people
21st-century LGBT people
Ghanaian LGBT people
1981 births